The Saddle Lake Warriors are a Junior "B" Ice Hockey team based in Saddle Lake, Alberta, Canada. They are members of the North Eastern Alberta Junior B Hockey League (NEAJBHL). They play their home games at Manitou Kihew Arena.

Season-by-season record

Note: GP = Games played, W = Wins, L = Losses, OTL = Overtime Losses, Pts = Points, GF = Goals for, GA = Goals against, PIM = Penalties in minutes

See also
List of ice hockey teams in Alberta

External links
Official website of the Saddle Lake Warriors

Ice hockey teams in Alberta